Tángfāng may refer to the following locations in China:

 Tangfang, Hebei (唐坊镇)
 Tangfang, Heilongjiang (糖坊镇), town in Bin County
 Tangfang, Shandong (唐坊镇), town in Gaoqing County
 Tangfang Township, Jiangxi (塘坊乡), in Guangchang County
 Tangfang Township, Shaanxi (汤坊乡), in Xingping